Ignite is a program for gifted and talented young people in South Australia, created in 1997 and formerly known as SHIP (Students with High Intellectual Potential). It is administered by the South Australian Department of Education and Children's Services.

How the program works
At the beginning of the school year in South Australia (i.e. January), DfE (Department for Education) advertises for Year 6 or Year 7 applicants to take part in the program in the following year. The applicants are charged $100 and take a test made up of reading comprehension, written literacy, mathematics and an Abstract Reasoning test at one of the three participating schools Aberfoyle Park High School, Glenunga International High School, or The Heights School. The best of the students who completed the test are notified later in the year (usually in the first term).  Students are ranked on their performance and an aggregate is determined. The test is designed by ACER (Australian Council for Educational Research). Students who are eligible for school card do not pay the $100.

The top 25 students are given a chance to "skip" year 9 with the Ignite compacted course, these student can pick any of the following courses if they do not wish to do compacted: Maths accelerated (rank 25-50 needed), English accelerated (rank 50-75 needed) and Broad focus (75-100, or the waiting list, which does not "skip" any subject but does go into deeper study). None of the courses are forced on the students, and they are allowed to pick another course, but the new course cannot be the compacted course if the student did not receive an offer.(e.g. A maths student cannot move to compacted).

Programs
As well as the Ignite compacted program, there is also Maths accelerated, English Accelerated and Broad focus, which is similar to the compacted program, except that children in this program do not "skip" year nine.

References

External links
Official Ignite Website
The Heights School
Glenunga International High School
Aberfoyle Park High School

Education in South Australia
Gifted education
Australian educational programs
1998 establishments in Australia